Allison Keith-Shipp  is an American voice actress who is best known for her English-dubbing work with ADV Films on anime movies and television series as Neon Genesis Evangelion, in which she voiced the character Misato Katsuragi. Keith was introduced to voice acting by Amanda Winn Lee when they were in an improv troupe together, and began with the part of Gamera in Gunsmith Cats; she cites Sakura in Blue Seed as her favorite character. She has a bachelor's degree in theater from the University of Houston, and a teacher's certification. She used to live in New York and Los Angeles doing occasional work for Central Park Media and Bandai Entertainment. In 2009, she reprised her role as Misato Katsuragi for the Rebuild of Evangelion films for Funimation, and has been doing voice work for Sentai Filmworks.

Personal life
Keith is married to Todd Shipp, and they have two children. Outside of voice acting, she has worked as a teacher, and realtor.

Filmography

Anime

Film

References

 2008 "Allison Keith Interview", Carl Horn, Animerica 6:3. A two-page interview

Living people
1974 births
20th-century American actresses
21st-century American actresses
American child actresses
American voice actresses
Place of birth missing (living people)
People from Houston
University of Houston alumni
Actresses from New York City
Actresses from Los Angeles